Erwin S. Strauss is an American author, science fiction fan, noted member of the MITSFS, and filk musician, born in Washington, D.C. He frequently is known by the nickname "Filthy Pierre".

Science fiction and writing
Strauss has been chairman of a number of science fiction conventions, such as Boskone 3 in 1966 and RailCon in 1975; and a member of the committee for at least one Worldcon, Noreascon 3, in 1989. He was an early (1964) vice president of the MIT Science Fiction Society. In addition, he is the author of the monthly "SF Convention Calendar" in Isaac Asimov's Science Fiction magazine, and his flyer racks ("Filthy boards") are seen at conventions all over the East Coast. He is the author and/or editor of a number of books, articles, and fanzines. He is a frequent Guest of Honor at SF conventions, including Arisia, Boskone, and Albacon. Strauss is the creator of the Voodoo board message board system once used at conventions such as Worldcons, WisCon, and Arisia.

Libertarian publishing
Strauss is most well known in libertarian circles for his longstanding publication of The Connection, an amateur press association (APA). The APA was started under the name The Libertarian Connection by Durk Pearson and Sandy Shaw (using pseudonyms) in 1968. Strauss wrote for it as "Filthy Pierre" almost from the beginning, and in 1979 he took over as publisher. Although Strauss dropped the word "libertarian" from the title (to indicate that it was open to all participants), the strong libertarian perspective of the contributors remained. Strauss continued to publish the APA for nearly 30 years and had continued to publish it as of 2012.

Honors
Magic Carpet Con, 1996 – Co-Filk Guest of Honor
ConChord 2002 – Interfilk guest
Noreascon 4 (2004) – Special Committee Award
Filk Hall of Fame (inducted 1998)
Big Heart Award, 2004.
Albacon 2012 – Fan Guest of Honor
Balticon 2018 - Fan Guest of Honor

Publications

Books
Filthy Pierre's Songs of MIT
Filthy Pierre's Songs of Significance
How to Start Your Own Country. Loompanics, 1979.
Basement Nukes: The Consequences of Cheap Weapons of Mass Destruction
Complete Guide to Science Fiction Conventions
The Case Against a Libertarian Political Party. Loompanics, 1980.
MIT Science Fiction Society's Index to the S-F Magazines, 1951–1965, 1966

APAs (amateur press association publications)
The Connection (OE, 1979– )

Fanzines
SF Convention Register (1974–96)
Filthy Pierre's Microfilk (1975–83)

See also

References

External links
Biography
Noreascon site
Erwin Strauss in the Con Suite of the Stromata Science Fiction Convention
Brief interview with Strauss at the 2020 Boskone

Year of birth missing (living people)
Living people
American libertarians
American non-fiction writers
Asimov's Science Fiction people
Filkers